The Arthur Ashe Courage Award (sometimes called the Arthur Ashe Award for Courage or Arthur Ashe Courage and Humanitarian Award) is presented as part of the ESPY Awards. It is named for the American tennis player Arthur Ashe. Although it is a sport-oriented award, it is not limited to sports-related people or actions, as it is presented annually to individuals whose contributions "transcend sports". According to ESPN, the organization responsible for giving out the award, "recipients reflect the spirit of Arthur Ashe, possessing strength in the face of adversity, courage in the face of peril and the willingness to stand up for their beliefs no matter what the cost". The award was presented as part of the ESPY Awards ceremony at the Microsoft Theater in Los Angeles from 2008 to 2019. The 2020 ESPYs ceremony was held virtually due to the COVID-19 pandemic, with the Ashe Award being one of the few awards presented, and the 2021 ceremony was held in New York City.

The inaugural award, made at the 1993 ESPY Awards, was presented to the American college basketball player, coach, and broadcaster Jim Valvano. In 1993, ESPN partnered with Valvano to create the V Foundation which presents the annual Jimmy V Award to "a deserving member of the sporting world who has overcome great obstacles through perseverance and determination." Suffering from cancer, Valvano gave the inaugural Arthur Ashe Courage Award acceptance speech which "brought a howling, teary-eyed Madison Square Garden to its feet". Valvano died two months after receiving the award. Although the award is usually given to individuals, it has been presented to multiple recipients on seven occasions: former athletes on United Airlines Flight 93 (2002), Pat and Kevin Tillman (2003), Emmanuel Ofosu Yeboah and Jim MacLaren (2005), Roia Ahmad and Shamila Kohestani (2006), Trevor Ringland and David Cullen (2007), and Tommie Smith, John Carlos (2008), and survivors of the USA Gymnastics sex abuse scandal (2018). The accolade has been presented posthumously on five occasions.

The award has not been without controversy: in June 2015, ESPN's announcement of Caitlyn Jenner as the recipient of that year's Arthur Ashe Courage Award led to significant criticism among online commenters and some members of the media, with Bob Costas calling the decision to give Jenner the award a "crass exploitation play". Many critics of the Jenner award considered Lauren Hill, who played college basketball despite suffering from a brain tumor that would claim her life only a few months later, a more worthy recipient. Others cited Noah Galloway, an Iraq War double amputee who competes in extreme sports and was also a finalist in the 20th season of Dancing with the Stars in 2015, as a worthy candidate.

The 2022 recipient of the Arthur Ashe Courage Award was Vitali Klitschko.

Recipients

See also
 Laureus Sport for Good Award
 SEC community service team
 Walter Payton NFL Man of the Year Award (football)
 Allstate AFCA Good Works Team
 Bart Starr Award (football)
 NBA Community Assist Award (basketball)
 J. Walter Kennedy Citizenship Award (basketball)
 List of volunteer awards

References

ESPY Awards
Courage awards
Awards established in 1993
1993 establishments in the United States